Sacred Waters (German: An heiligen Wassern) is a 1960 Swiss drama film directed by Alfred Weidenmann and starring Hansjörg Felmy, Cordula Trantow and Hanns Lothar. It was based on a novel by Jakob Christoph Heer, which had previously been made into a film in 1932.

Cast
 Hansjörg Felmy as Roman Blatter
 Cordula Trantow as Binja
 Hanns Lothar as Thöni Grieg
 Karl John as Seppi Blatter, Romans Vater
 Gustav Knuth as Der Presi, Hans Waldisch, Wirt zum Bären
 Gisela von Collande as Fränzi Blatter, Romans Mutter
 Margrit Rainer as Creszenz Waldisch, die Bärenwirtin
 Leopold Biberti as Der Garde, Hans Zuensteinen
 Uta Kohlhoff as Vroni Blatter, Roman Blatters Schwester
 Hans Hessling as Bälzi
 Walter Ladengast as Kaplan Johannes
 Fritz Schulz as Der Dorfpfarrer
 Jean Bruno as Thugi
 John Bentley as Lemmy, ein Engländer
 Schaggi Streuli as Landrat

References

External links

1960 films
1960 drama films
Swiss drama films
1960s German-language films
Films directed by Alfred Weidenmann
Mountaineering films
Films based on Swiss novels
Films set in the Alps
Remakes of German films